Paul Lucas was an American playwright and producer based in New York City. He was best known for his play, Trans Scripts, Part I: The Women, which won a Fringe First award at the Edinburgh Festival Fringe and a High Commendation from Amnesty International for Freedom of Expression, and was performed by the American Repertory Theater at Harvard University.

Career 
Lucas attended Dwight-Englewood School and graduated in 1979.

Lucas performed and worked in several theatrical offices in New York City before joining Paul Szilard Productions, where he booked for the Alvin Ailey American Dance Theater. While still working with Szilard, he produced several plays off-Broadway, including Messages for Gar which featured John Epperson and Alex McCord; TimeSlips, written by Anne Basting; Nosferatu, which starred Nikolai Kinski; and Son of Drakula, written and performed by David Drake. After a fellowship in Arts Administration at the John F. Kennedy Center for the Performing Arts, Lucas became the Director of Press and Marketing for Williamstown Theatre Festival.

Lucas founded Paul Lucas Productions, a production, management, and touring organization that specializes in international work. His work has regularly been presented at the Edinburgh Festival Fringe. He produced What I Heard About Iraq, an anti-Iraq War play by Simon Levy adapted from a prose poem by Eliot Weinberger. The play received a Fringe First award at the festival, as well as a tour in the UK tour and readings worldwide. In 2006, he and associate Gail Winar produced The Be(A)st of Taylor Mac, which starred Taylor Mac. The play explores the human condition and challenges the contemporary culture of fear through gender-bending surrealism. Be(A)st won a Herald Angel Award in Edinburgh, and also showed in various cities. He produced Woody Sez: The Life & Music of Woody Guthrie, which starred David M. Lutken. Woody Sez premiered at the festival in 2007 and later had tours in Europe and the United States. He produced the Edinburgh Festival Fringe presentation of Dai (enough), a one-woman show written and performed by Iris Bahr, who plays ten different characters in a Tel Aviv cafe moments before a suicide bomber enters. He has also worked with American comedian and drag performer Miss Coco Peru on several of Coco's events.

In 2012, Lucas turned his attention to creating his own work. He spent several years conducting interviews with men and women of the transgender community. After workshop productions at Rutgers University, the Lyric Theater in Bridport (UK), and the Actors Center (London), he created Trans Scripts, Part I: The Women with the guidance of his dramaturge, Morgan Jenness, and produced the play at the Pleasance Theater during the Edinburgh Festival Fringe in 2015 under the direction of Linda Ames Key. Trans Scripts received a Fringe First Award, a High Commendation from Amnesty International for Freedom of Expression, as well as nominations for the Best of Edinburgh Award, the Holden Street Theaters Award, and the Feminist Fest Award. On November 23, 2015, the American Repertory Theater (ART) at Harvard University sponsored a one-night reading of the script. ART produced the play in 2017, with support from grants by the National Endowment for the Arts. Cast members of Trans Scripts, Part I: The Women have included Calpernia Addams, Eden Lane, Bianca Leigh, Rebecca Root, and Jack Wetherall.

Lucas is currently working on the sequel for Trans Scripts, Part I: The Women, called, Trans Scripts, Part II: The Men.

References

American theatre managers and producers
Dwight-Englewood School alumni
Living people
Writers from New York City
1961 births